Myth of the Love Electrique is an album by the Acid Mothers Temple & The Melting Paraiso U.F.O., released in 2006 by Riot Season. This is the first album to feature Kitagawa Hao on vocals.

Track listing

Personnel

 Kitagawa Hao - voice
 Tsuyama Atsushi - monster bass, acoustic guitar, voice, one-legged flute, soprano recorder
 Higashi Hiroshi - synthesizer
 Shimura Koji - drums
 Kawabata Makoto - electric guitar, bouzouki, electric bouzouki, hurdy-gurdy, organ, synthesizer, electronics, tambura, sitar, percussion

Technical personnel

 Kawabata Makoto - Production and Engineering
 Yoshida Tatsuya - Digital Mastering
 Kawabata Sachiko - Artwork

References

External links
 http://www.discogs.com/Acid-Mothers-Temple-The-Melting-Paraiso-UFO-Acid-Motherly-Love/release/1130679

Acid Mothers Temple albums
2006 albums